The Sparcle is an experimental 32-bit microprocessor chip developed in 1992 by a consortium of MIT, LSI Corporation, and Sun Microsystems. It was an evolution Sun's SPARC RISC architecture with features geared towards "large-scale multiprocessing". The chip was manufactured by LSI.

Besides these enhancements the Sparcle was otherwise unremarkable, incorporating 200,000 transistors and dissipating two watts. It included no cache and had a clock speed of less than 40 MHz. The new features included:
 Features to tolerate and synchronize memory and communications latencies
 Features supporting fine-grained synchronization
 Features to initiate actions on remote processors and quickly respond to asynchronous events

The Sparcle was used to build the experimental Alewife computer at MIT.

References

External links
 
 

SPARC microprocessors
32-bit microprocessors
Massachusetts Institute of Technology